Shree Mani (born 15 September 1988), also known as SriMani, is an Indian lyricist well known for his works in Telugu cinema and his unique style of lyrics. He won Filmfare Award for Best Lyricist – Telugu for the film Attarintiki Daredi, penning the song "Aaradugula Bullet".

Early life 
Shree Mani's parents died during his young age and he was raised by his grandparents Koniki Dathatreyulu and Koniki Ramanamma. Since the age of 8, he developed an interest in poetry and writing.

Career 
During his days of bachelor's degree, his grandfather died, which planted a thought of his own employment and career. He moved then to Hyderabad for the job of a lyricist, after a lot of struggles director Sukumar gave him the first chance to write lyrics for a song in his film 100% Love and later on he shot to fame for his lyrics in Sega, which gave him good fame and name the great and legendary singer Padma Shri and Padma Bhushan SPBalasubramaniyam gave compliments to him for Varsham Munduga song in Sega in Padutha Theeyagaa program, which telecasts in Eenadu TV, leading him to Trivikram Srinivas to give him a chance in  Julai, Atharintiki Daredhi, S/O Sathyamurthy and more. He used to say the most memorable moment is when he got compliments for the lyrics in 100% Love from Devi Sri Prasad and Sukumar. He told never once sat down seriously with an intention to write, and his songs always used to happen spontaneously while travelling, working, with a few friends or on the move which he records in his phone immediately.

Discography

References

External links 
 

Indian male songwriters
Living people
Film musicians from Andhra Pradesh
Telugu-language lyricists
Filmfare Awards South winners
1988 births
People from Prakasam district